The Jalna-Nanded Expressway is a link road greenfield project that connects the largest cities of Marathwada (Jalna, Parbhani, Hingoli, and Nanded) to Mumbai-Nagpur Expressway, which is also officially known as Hindu Hrudaysamrat Balasaheb Thackeray Maharashtra Samruddhi Mahamarg. Proposed as 6-lane wide, this segment will reduce the road distance between Jalna and Nanded from 226 kilometres to 179 kilometres and bring down travel time between Nanded and Mumbai from 12 hours to around 6 hours.

Route Alignment 
The Jalna-Nanded Expressway will travel through Jalna, Parbhani, and Nanded districts directly. The 179-kilometre Jalna-Nanded segment passes through 87 villages. Around 93.52 kilometres of this segment passes through four tehsils in Parbhani, while 66.46 kilometres passes through three tehsils of Jalna and 19.82 kilometres passes through one tehsil in Nanded.

Cities & Towns
Below are the lists of cities/towns through which the Jalna-Nanded Expressway will connect:
North East of Jalna (Panshendra Village) connects to Mumbai-Nagpur Expressway
North of Partur
South of Mantha
North of Selu
North of Parbhani
South of Purna
South of Nanded (Kakandi Village)

Status updates
March 2021: Project Announcement at Maharashtra State Annual Budget 2021–22.
November 2021: Maharashtra State Rajpatra (Work Order) Release.
December 2021: Land Acquisition Process Start.
February 2022: 77% Land Acquisition Survey Completed.
November 2022: Land Acquisition Notification Release.
November 2022: 22000 Crore Rupees Fund Raising For Land Acquisition & Construction Work.

See also 
Mumbai–Nagpur Expressway
Delhi–Mumbai Expressway
Expressways in India
NHAI
Maharashtra State Road Development Corporation
Jalna Dry Port

References

Expressways in India
Transport in Jalna
Transport in Nanded